The 2015 iHeartRadio Music Awards was the second music award show presented by iHeartMedia's platform iHeartRadio and NBC. The awards were held on March 29, 2015, at the Shrine Auditorium in Los Angeles and were hosted by Jamie Foxx.

Taylor Swift won three awards, including Artist of the Year and Song of the Year, while Justin Timberlake was presented with the Innovator Award.

NBC's telecast of the iHeartRadio Music Awards matched the previous year's 1.7 rating with adults 18-49. Shifting from a May Thursday, it also took in 5.2 million viewers. The awards generated more than 14 billion social media impressions throughout the promotional period of the show, nearly 75 percent more than last year’s 8.5 billion and almost triple that of the 2015 Academy Awards.

Performers

House DJ
Alesso

Presenters
Gina Rodriguez — Presented Best Lyrics
Billy Eichner — Introduced Florida Georgia Line
Ludacris — Presented Hip Hop/R&B Song of the Year
5 Seconds of Summer — Introduced Meghan Trainor
Tom Ford — Presented the Innovator Award to Justin Timberlake
Taraji P. Henson — Introduced Rihanna
Jeremy Piven — Presented Best New Artist
Reba — Presented Country Song of the Year
Meghan Trainor — Introduced Jason Aldean
Ryan Tedder — Presented Best Fan Army
Mike Tyson —  Introduced Madonna
Brittany Snow & Anna Camp — Presented Best Collaboration
Alanna Masterson — Introduced Jason Derulo
Steven Yeun — Presented Renegade
Ryan Seacrest — Introduced Jamie Foxx and Chris Brown & Presented Artist of the Year
Ian Ziering & The Left Shark — Presented Dance Song of the Year
Madonna — Presented Song of the Year

Winners and nominees

References

2015
2015 in American music
2015 in California
2015 music awards
2015 in Los Angeles
March 2015 events in the United States